Gharmala (Urdu:گھرمالہ ) is a village located in Jhelum District, Punjab, Pakistan. It is part of Jhelum Tehsil. and lies along Rohtas Road. The village is about 3 km west of Jhelum and has a population of over 5,000. It has girls' and boys' high schools. Two mosques are there.

Geography
The village lies at the foot of Pothohar Plateau. The ground experiences all four seasons. In summer the temperature can exceed . The monsoon starts in the middle of July and lasts for 4 to 6 weeks. Winters are mostly dry and cold. December is relatively wet and temperature can fall below 0 °C.

Notables 
 Chaudhri Khadim Hussain ex MNA is senior politician from Gharmala. He started his career as banker but later resigned from his job and start taking part in local elections. In 1985 he elected as MPA of Punjab assembly. In his political career he was elected 5 times MPA and in 2013 he was elected MNA. He defeated Raja M Afzal Khan twice, both in MPA and MNA election. 

 Khan Riaz, former student welfare officer, is from Gharmala. He has been involved in welfare work all his life. He runs a girls' madrasa in the village, and donated land for the madrasa. 
 Arshad Dar ex mayor of Brent council London is also from Gharmala. He’s Labour Party Councilor in London borough.
Tariq Dar, chairman of the Pakistan Community centre in London, is also from Gharmala. He plays an important role in the welfare of people in London and Gharmala. In 2019 he was awarded MBE by The Queen for his services to charities for the last 40 years.
 Qadeer Hussain - UET graduate from the village. HE passed his degree as an Architect from UET Lahore and working in IT related job in the UK.
 Retired Naval officer Commodore(rank equal to Brigadier in army) Ali Abbas is also from Gharmala. His father Lt Commander Ali Asghar (late) was also commissioned officer in Pak Navy. Ali Abbas was very talented Naval officer and served in lot of countries like China, France and Egypt. He’s retired from Pak Navy and now serving as director of Maritime department of Naval College in Karachi.
 Nadeem Afzal Bunty who’s PTI joint secretary Rawalpindi division also from Gharmala. Recently he was appointed by Chief Minister of Punjab (Mr Usman Buzdar) as Vice Chairman of Punjab Tourism and Cultural Heritage department.

Transport 
Gharmala is connected by different roads to other villages and to Jhelum city. Jhelum Railway Station is about 2.5 km and GT road is 2 km. Rohtas Road passes by the village on the south which leads to Jhelum City on east and to Rohtas Fort on the west. It is old track of the GT Road.

References

Populated places in Tehsil Jhelum
Union councils of Jhelum Tehsil